Robert Law Joss  (born June 5, 1941) is an American businessman, banker, and former university administrator.

Early life and education
Robert Joss received his BA degree in economics from the University of Washington in 1965. A Sloan Fellow at Stanford in 1965-1966, he received his MBA degree there in 1967 and his PhD degree in 1970.

Career

After service as a White House Fellow, he was Deputy to the Assistant Secretary of the Treasury for Economic Policy.

In 1971, he began his banking career with Wells Fargo Bank, rising to the post of Vice Chairman in 1986. In 1993 he left Wells Fargo to accept the position of Chief Executive Officer and Managing Director of Westpac, one of Australia's largest banks. During six years with Westpac in Sydney, he helped modernize and streamline operations and refocus the bank's business culture to emphasize teamwork, open lines of communication, customer focus and community support.

He returned to the United States in 1999 to become Philip H. Knight Professor and Dean of the Graduate School of Business at Stanford, where he remained until 2009. He is currently a member of the school's faculty, as an Emeritus Professor.

He formerly served on the boards of Westpac, Wells Fargo, Agilent Technologies, Inc., BEA Systems, E.piphany, Inc., Makena Capital and Shanghai Commercial Bank, Ltd. of Hong Kong and SRI International. He currently serves on the board of directors of Citigroup, Bechtel, Makena Capital Management and C.M. Capital. He also serves as co-chair of the advisory council for the U.S. Studies Centre at the University of Sydney. He has served as chairman of the Australian Bankers' Association.

Honours
On 26 January 2016, Joss was named a Companion of the Order of Australia for eminent service to business and finance through executive roles with major banking institutions, and as a contributor to taxation policy and reform, to education as an academic and administrator, to professional organisations, and to the community. Joss was also awarded the Centenary Medal in 2001 for service to Australian society through banking and reform of the Australian taxation system.

References

1941 births
Living people
University of Washington College of Arts and Sciences alumni
Wells Fargo
Stanford University Graduate School of Business faculty
Stanford Graduate School of Business alumni
American academic administrators
American chief executives of financial services companies
Directors of Citigroup
Westpac people
Stanford Sloan Fellows
Directors of SRI International
Companions of the Order of Australia
Recipients of the Centenary Medal